José Manuel Figueroa, Jr. (born May 15, 1975, in Chicago, Illinois) is a Mexican-American singer, songwriter, and actor who specializes in Regional Mexican music. He is the eldest of eight children of singer-songwriter Joan Sebastian.

Personal life
José Manuel Figueroa was born on May 15, 1975, to Mexican singer Joan Sebastian and Teresa Figueroa-González in Chicago, Illinois, United States. He is the eldest child of said relationship. His brothers were Juan Sebastian Figueroa(†) and Trigo de Jesus Figueroa(†).  His father died in July 2015.

Discography 
 Expulsado del Paraiso (1995)
 Jose Manuel Figueroa (1998)
 Mala Hierba (1999)
 A Caballo (2002)
 Inmortal (2004)
 Rosas y Espinas (2013)
 No Estás Tú (2017)
 Paso a Pasito (2022)

Series 
In 2016 he portrayed his father Joan Sebastian in the miniseries Por Siempre Joan Sebastian.

References

1975 births
Living people
21st-century Mexican male singers